The 1983–84 Houston Rockets season featured the NBA debut of Ralph Sampson, whom the Rockets had selected as the first pick of the 1983 NBA draft. Under head coach Bill Fitch, the team finished with a 29–53 record, although Sampson won the NBA Rookie of the Year Award.

The team has been cited as an example of a "tanking", by deciding to play more more bench players after starting the season with a 20–26 record, in order to fall in the standings and get higher in the draft order for the following season. The Rockets finished last in the Western Conference and later won a coin flip that gave them the first section in the 1984 NBA draft, with which they selected Akeem Olajuwon.

Draft picks

Roster

<noinclude>

Regular season

Season standings

Record vs. opponents

Game log

Player statistics

Season

Awards and records

Awards
 Ralph Sampson, NBA Rookie of the Year Award
 Ralph Sampson, All-NBA Second Team
 Ralph Sampson, NBA All-Rookie Team 1st Team

Records

Transactions

Trades

Free agents

Additions

Subtractions

See also
1983–84 NBA season

References

Houston Rockets seasons
Hou